Ząbkowice Śląskie is a town in Lower Silesian Voivodeship, in south-western Poland. It is the seat of Ząbkowice Śląskie County and of a local municipality called Gmina Ząbkowice Śląskie. , it had a population of 15,004.

History
The town was established by Duke of Silesia Henry IV Probus, of the Piast dynasty, as Frankenstein in the early 13th century, following the Mongol invasion of Poland. The town was founded in the vicinity of the old Polish settlement of Sadlno, through which ran a trade route connecting Silesia and Bohemia. The town was sited on a piece of land that belonged partly to the episcopal lands of Zwrócona and partly to the Monastery at Trzebnica. The town was located exactly halfway between the sites of two previously existing towns that had failed to attract enough settlers: Frankenberg and Löwenstein, and inherited its German name from both. Its positioning on the so-called King's Road between Prague and Wrocław, not too far from the commercially important city of Kłodzko would favour the development of the town. The town received municipal rights around 1280, the first mention of civitas Frankenstein is dated 10 January 1287. At the beginning of the 14th century, the first town hall and the castle were erected. The city remained under rule of the Polish Piast dynasty before it was sold to the Bohemian (Czech) King in 1351.

In 1428 the city was invaded by the Hussites. In 1456, Bohemian King Ladislaus the Posthumous gave the city in hereditary possession to the Czech noble Podiebrad family, to which it belonged until 1569. The city was heavily damaged in 1468, during the Bohemian–Hungarian War, and until 1490 it belonged to the Kingdom of Hungary, before becoming again part of Bohemia. In the 16th century, the castle and defensive walls were rebuilt. Trade and craft flourished. In the early 17th century the plague killed about one third of the population, and it has been speculated that events at that time may have inspired the Frankenstein story. The Thirty Years' War (1618–1648) ended the town's prosperity. Austrian and Swedish troops marched through the city, which was severely damaged. Afterwards, until the late 19th century, it remained a small town. In 1742 it was annexed by Prussia.

In 1858 the town burned down and had to be rebuilt. On this occasion, the upper part of the 15th-century leaning tower was reconstructed in a straight manner. The town was a county seat from 1816 to 1945. From 1871 to 1945 it was part of Germany. In the final stages of World War II, in 1945, a German-conducted death march of thousands of prisoners of several subcamps of the Auschwitz concentration camp passed through the town towards the Gross-Rosen concentration camp. The town was not destroyed during the war. After Germany's defeat in World War II, the town once again became part of Poland, along with most of Silesia, and was renamed Ząbkowice Śląskie in 1946. The totality of its population was expelled in accordance with the Potsdam Agreement. Ząbkowice Śląskie was repopulated by Poles expelled from former Eastern Poland, annexed by the Soviet Union, as well as those arriving from central Poland.

Sights
Ząbkowice Śląskie is often called the Silesian Pisa as it is known for its Leaning Tower (Krzywa Wieża), which is one of the main attractions in this part of Poland. However, there are also tourist attractions such as the 13th-century fortifications and the ruins of a 14th-century castle.
The Leaning Tower (Krzywa Wieża)
13th century fortifications
Main Post Office
Ruins of the Ducal Castle
Saint Anne's Church
Town Hall
Church of the Nativity of Virgin Mary
Saint Hedwig's Church

Notable people
 David Pareus (1548–1622), German Reformed Protestant theologian and reformer
 Karl von Strotha (1786–1870), Prussian officer and Minister of War 
 Fritz Erler (1868–1940), German artist, born in Frankenstein
 Wilhelm Kroll (1869–1939), German classic philologist 
 Günther Specht (1914–1945), Luftwaffe pilot
 Horst Hannig (1921–1943), Luftwaffe pilot
 Piotr Zieliński (born 1994), Polish football player

Twin towns – sister cities
See twin towns of Gmina Ząbkowice Śląskie.

References

External links
  Ząbkowice Śląskie municipal website
 Frankenstein.pl: events of 1606 involving undertakers which might have inspired the 1818 novel by Mary Shelley
 Jewish Community in Ząbkowice Śląskie on Virtual Shtetl
 "Annales Francostenen" of 1655
  Frankenstein-Schlesien.de
 
 

Cities and towns in Lower Silesian Voivodeship
Ząbkowice Śląskie County